The R. N. Irwin Stakes is a South Australian Jockey Club Group 3 Weight for Age Thoroughbred horse race for three year olds and older, run over a distance of 1100 metres at Morphettville Racecourse, Adelaide, Australia in the autumn.  Total prize money for the race is A$127,250.

History
The race was originally run in January but was moved to March as part of the change in dates for the Adelaide Cup carnival in 2006. The race was moved again in 2012 to April and the race is now a lead up preparation race for the Goodwood Handicap.

Name
1955–2006 - R.N. Irwin Stakes
 2007 - German Arms Hotel Stakes
 2008 - CMA Recycling Stakes 
2009 onwards - R.N. Irwin Stakes

Distance
1955–1972 - 6 furlongs (~1200 metres)
1973–1974 - 1200 metres
1975–1979 - 1100 metres
1980–1981 - 1450 metres
1982–1985 - 1200 metres
1986–2000 - 1100 metres
2001–2002 - 1000 metres
2003 onwards - 1100 metres

Grade
1955–1979 - Principal Race
1980–1990 - Group 2
1991 onwards - Group 3

Venue
1955–1979 - Morphettville
1980–1981 - Victoria Park
1982–2000 - Morphettville
 2001 - Victoria Park
 2002 - Cheltenham Park
2003 onwards - Morphettville

Winners

 2022 - Bella Vella
 2021 - Kemalpasa
 2020 - Gytrash
 2019 - Hard Empire
 2018 - Dainty Tess
 2017 - Viddora
 2016 - Nostradamus
 2015 - Daytona Grey
 2014 - Driefontein
 2013 - Kulgrinda
 2012 - We're Gonna Rock
 2011 - Avenue
 2010 - Augusta Proud
 2009 - Diplomatic Force
 2008 - Here De Angels
 2007 - Flying Object
 2006 - Leone Chiara
 2005 - Super Elegant
 2004 - Stand By Me
 2003 - Bomber Bill
 2002 - Regal Kiss
 2001 - Stand By Me
 2000 - Suit
 1999 - Sports
 1998 - La Baraka
 1997 - Scorn Bold
 1996 - Scorn Bold
 1995 - Hero Wind
 1994 - Kenvain
 1993 - Hot Arch
 1992 - Street Ruffian
 1991 - Beau George
 1990 - Leica Western
 1989 - Jet Fighter
 1988 - Redelva
 1987 - Lord Galaxy
 1986 - Rory's Jester
 1985 - Red Tempo
 1984 - Copper Rocket
 1983 - Montrose Lass
 1982 - Galleon
 1981 - Ducatoon
 1980 - Domax
 1979 - Stormy Rex
 1978 - Lipman
 1977 - Silent Gift
 1976 - High Value
 1975 - Red Loam
 1974 - Toltrice
 1973 - Idolou
 1972 - Eastern Court
 1971 - Sanderae
 1970 - Fileur
 1969 - Steel Helmet
 1968 - Fileur
 1967 - Sunny Coronation
 1966 - Contempler
 1965 - Millionairess
 1964 - Naelyn
 1963 - Benibasha
 1962 - Kelvin Valley
 1961 - Rain King
 1960 - Bomba
 1959 - Power Duke
 1958 - Sleep Tight
 1957 - In Transit
 1956 - Columbo King
 1955 - Never Rest

See also
 List of Australian Group races
 Group races

References

Horse races in Australia
Sport in Adelaide